Julie Carolyn Ward (born 7 March 1957) is a British politician who served as a Member of the European Parliament for the North West England region for the Labour Party from 2014 to 2020.

Career 
Ward has a master's degree in Education and International Development from Newcastle University, graduating from an adult learning course in 2012. Before being elected as an MEP, she was part of an international delegation to Belfast to discuss the role of the arts in peace processes and also ran a social enterprise.

In 2016 she wrote that Turkey was "becoming a fascist state".

Ward organises events for One Billion Rising, campaigns against violence against women, and is an opponent of Brexit. In 2018 she joined in launching a campaign group, "Left against Brexit", seeking to change the Labour Party's position to supporting membership of the EU. Julie is currently a member of Open Labour’s National Committee.

European Parliament
Ward was third on the Labour Party list for the European Parliament in the May 2014 election, and was elected with Labour taking a third seat from the Lib Dems in the North West England region. At the May 2019 election, Ward was second on the Labour party list for the North West, after Theresa Griffin, and both were elected, while the third Labour seat was lost, with the party's vote falling from 33.9to 21.9 per cent.

Committee and delegations memberships
As of 2014, Ward was a member of one European Parliament Committee, the Committee on Culture and Education, and also of one Delegation, that on International relations with Bosnia and Herzegovina, and Kosovo.
She was also a substitute member for the Committee on Regional Development, the Committee on Women's Rights and Gender Equality, and the Delegation to the ACP-EU Joint Parliamentary Assembly, meaning that she could take the place of another socialist group member on occasions.

References

External links 
 
 

Living people
21st-century women MEPs for England
Labour Party (UK) MEPs
MEPs for England 2014–2019
MEPs for England 2019–2020
Alumni of Newcastle University
1957 births
People from Ripon